Adarsha Vidyalaya is an educational institute in the Buldhana district, Maharashtra. The institute hosts primary, secondary and higher secondary schools in the same campus. Adarsha Vidyalaya Chikhli also has some branches in nearby villages. 
The institute offers education in Indian cultural values along with the studies of regular curriculum. It organises and celebrates different Indian festivals like Krishna Janmashtami, Ganeshotsav, Dnyaneshwari Parayan, etc. Adarsha Vidyalaya has been doing a lot of social work in and around Chikhli.

Schools in Maharashtra
Education in Buldhana district